John David Ashton (born February 22, 1948) is an American actor, known for his roles in Beverly Hills Cop, Beverly Hills Cop II, Some Kind of Wonderful  and Midnight Run.

Life and career
Born in Springfield, Massachusetts, Ashton attended Defiance College in Ohio and is a graduate of the University of Southern California School of Theatre. He attended Enfield High School in Enfield, Connecticut.

Ashton has made numerous appearances in both television and feature films. He played Willie Joe Garr on several episodes of Dallas. He appeared in an episode of Columbo, "Negative Reaction", and in episode 5 of Police Squad!, "Rendezvous at Big Gulch (Terror in the Neighborhood)".

His early film credits included roles in An Eye for an Eye (1973), Breaking Away (1979), Borderline (1980), Honky Tonk Freeway (1981), in (1985)episode of the twilight zone (the chameleon )  Last Resort (1986) and King Kong Lives (1986).

Ashton also starred as Detective Sergeant John Taggart in the first two installments of the Beverly Hills Cop trilogy, alongside Eddie Murphy and Judge Reinhold. He appeared as Eric Stoltz's character's father in the 1987 John Hughes-penned comedy-drama Some Kind of Wonderful, and worked with Hughes again in She's Having a Baby the following year. In 1988, he co-starred in the action-comedy Midnight Run as a rival bounty hunter to Robert De Niro's character. He also starred in Little Big League (1994) with Luke Edwards, Trapped in Paradise (1994), The Shooter (1995), Meet the Deedles (1998), Instinct (1999), and appeared in a supporting role in the 2007 drama Gone Baby Gone directed by Ben Affleck. He also played the role of Cactus Jack Slater in an episode of the 80s TV show The A-Team titled "Cup A Joe".

Ashton has stated that, given the proper arrangements, he would like to reprise his roles in the rumored Beverly Hills Cop IV and Midnight Run II productions. He guest-starred opposite Beverly Hills Cop co-star Ronny Cox in an episode of Matthew Perry's 2011 series, Mr Sunshine.

Personal life
Ashton married his first wife Victoria Marie Runn in 1968: they divorced in 1970. He married his second wife Bridget Baker-Ashton in 1976: they divorced in 2001. Ashton has two children, one by each of his ex-wives. He has a daughter from his first marriage. He currently resides in Fort Collins, Colorado.

Filmography

Film

Television

References

External links
 
 

1948 births
Living people
American male film actors
American male television actors
Male actors from Massachusetts
Actors from Springfield, Massachusetts
USC School of Dramatic Arts alumni